Hexensabbat (Witches' Sabbath) is a solo piano album by Irène Schweizer. Two tracks were recorded live at the Townhall Charlottenburg in Berlin on October 8, 1977, and the remaining tracks were recorded at the FMP-Studio in Berlin on October 10, 1977. The album was released in 1978 by FMP.

Reception

In a review for AllMusic, Eugene Chadbourne wrote that the album "takes a well-used, and quite practical approach of combining live and studio performances. From the former event comes 'Rapunzel...Rapunzel', one of the performances from this pianist that approaches masterpiece status... [She] has a rowdy sense of humour... not only present in titles such as 'Dykes on Bykes' but in some of the chances she takes as an improviser."

Track listing
All compositions by Irène Schweizer.

 "Hexensabbat" – 8:54
 "Rapunzel…Rapunzel…!" – 11:34
 "Chabis" – 2:21
 "Choix Mixed" – 4:51
 "Dykes On Bykes" – 4:17
 "Lavender Valse" – 3:09
 "Monkey Woman" – 3:50
 "Baba-Rum" – 4:01

Personnel 
 Irène Schweizer – piano

References

1978 live albums
FMP Records live albums
Irène Schweizer live albums